The Good News and the Bad News is the third studio album by The Rainmakers, released in 1989.

A remastered version of the album was released in 2010 with 7 additional bonus tracks.

Track listing 
All tracks written by Bob Walkenhorst except where noted.

 "Reckoning Day" – 3:10
 "Hoo Dee Hoo" – 4:28
 "Spend It on Love" – 2:54
 "Battle of the Roses" – 4:08
 "Wild Oats" – 3:17
 "We Walk the Levee" – 4:14
 "Thirty Days" – 4:08
 "Knock on Wood" (Steve Phillips) – 3:18
 "Dry Dry Land" – 3:31
 "Shiny Shiny" – 2:52
 "Johnny Reb" – 2:32
 "Horn O Plenty" – 2:12

Bonus tracks on 2010 Remastered CD
 "Frustration Train" (acoustic) – 5:11
 "Renaissance Man" (acoustic) – 4:10
 "Prove Me Wrong" (acoustic) – 4:18
 "Downstream" (acoustic) – 3:04
 "Johnny Reb" (acoustic) – 2:41
 "Spend It on Love" (acoustic) – 3:05
 "Shenandoah" (traditional American folk song) (acoustic) – 2:46

Personnel

The Rainmakers
Bob Walkenhorst – lead vocals, guitar
Rich Ruth – bass guitar, vocals
Steve Phillips – lead guitar, vocals, lead vocal on "Knock on Wood"
Pat Tomek – drums

Additional musicians 
Joanna Dean – vocals on "Dry Dry Land"
Johnny Reno – saxophone on "Horn O Plenty", gang vocals on "Hoo Dee Hoo"

References 

1989 albums
Mercury Records albums
The Rainmakers (band) albums